The American Journal of Medical Quality is a bimonthly peer-reviewed academic journal covering quality control in medicine. The editor-in-chief is David B. Nash (Jefferson School of Population Health). It was established in 1986 and was formerly published by SAGE Publications in association with the American College of Medical Quality. Wolters Kluwer Health has published it since January 2021.

Abstracting and indexing 
The journal is abstracted and indexed in Scopus and the Science Citation Index Expanded. According to the Journal Citation Reports, its 2014 impact factor is 1.252.

References

External links 
 
 American College of Medical Quality

English-language journals
Healthcare journals
Bimonthly journals
Publications established in 1992
Wolters Kluwer academic journals